Salmons is an unincorporated community in Simpson County, Kentucky, United States.  It lies along U.S. Route 31W north of the city of Franklin, the county seat of Simpson County.  Its elevation is 676 feet (206 m).

References

Unincorporated communities in Simpson County, Kentucky
Unincorporated communities in Kentucky